Soulsmith may refer to:
a trilogy of novels by Tom Deitz
Soulsmith (film), 2017 Irish film